In cryptozoology and ufology, "rods" (also known as "skyfish", "air rods", or "solar entities") are elongated visual artifacts appearing in photographic images and video recordings. 

Most optical analysis to date have concluded that the images are insects moving across the frame as the photo is being captured.

Optical analysis
Robert Todd Carroll (2003), having consulted an entomologist (Doug Yanega), identified rods as images of flying insects recorded over several cycles of wing-beating on video recording devices. The insect captured on image a number of times, while propelling itself forward, gives the illusion of a single elongated rod-like body, with bulges.

A 2000 report by staff at "The Straight Dope" also explained rods as such phenomena, namely tricks of light which result from how (primarily video) images of flying insects are recorded and played back, adding that investigators have shown the rod-like bodies to be a result of motion blur, if the camera is shooting with relatively long exposure times.

The claims of these being extraordinary creatures, possibly alien, have been advanced by either people with active imaginations, or hoaxers.

In August 2005, China Central Television (CCTV) aired a two-part documentary about flying rods in China.  It reported the events from May to June of the same year at Tonghua Zhenguo Pharmaceutical Company in Tonghua City, Jilin Province, which debunked the flying rods. Surveillance cameras in the facility's compound captured video footage of flying rods identical to those shown in Jose Escamilla's video. Getting no satisfactory answer to the phenomenon, curious scientists at the facility decided that they would try to solve the mystery by attempting to catch these airborne creatures. Huge nets were set up and the same surveillance cameras then captured images of rods flying into the trap. When the nets were inspected, the "rods" were no more than regular moths and other ordinary flying insects. Subsequent investigations proved that the appearance of flying rods on video was an optical illusion created by the slower recording speed of the camera.

After attending a lecture by Jose Escamilla, UFO investigator Robert Sheaffer wrote that "some of his “rods” were obviously insects zipping across the field at a high angular rate" and others appeared to be “appendages” which were birds' wings blurred by the camera exposure.

Paranormal claims
Various paranormal interpretations of this phenomenon appear in popular culture. One of the more outspoken proponents of rods as alien life forms was Jose Escamilla, who claimed to have been the first to film them on March 19, 1994 in Roswell, New Mexico, while attempting to film a UFO. Escamilla later made additional videos and embarked on lecture tours to promote his claims.

In popular culture
 In the manga and anime series JoJo's Bizarre Adventure, the Stone Ocean part features a character named Rikiel with the Stand ability "Sky High" that allows him to control rods, which are described as real unidentified animals, and use them to attack his enemies by absorbing their body heat.
 In the video game Castlevania: Aria of Sorrow, there is a rare enemy type called Sky Fish based on the "rod" phenomenon. Sky Fish resemble rods in appearance, and can only be defeated by slowing down time.
In the video game Danganronpa: Trigger Happy Havoc, if you hang out and give him presents during a Free-Time Event, the character Yasuhiro Hagakure will have dialogue about Skyfish and their appearance in Kamata, Tokyo.
 The 2010 Super Sentai series, Tensou Sentai Goseiger featured the antagonistic cryptid-themed monster group Yuumajuu. One of their members is Zaigo of the Skyfish, who has the secondary theme of stick insect.
 In the 2015 Kemono Friends mobile game, Skyfish appears as a playable Friend and minor character.

Explanatory notes

See also
 Optical phenomena
 Orb (optics)

References

External links
 Jose Escamilla's "Rods" Video Sequences
 
 Famous video of "rods" at the Cave of the Swallows
 Detailed video analysis
 Sky High page on the JoJo wiki

Cryptozoology
Unidentified flying objects
Alleged UFO-related entities
Pseudoscience